The All India Council for Technical Education (AICTE) is a statutory body, and a national-level council for technical education, under the Department of Higher Education. Established in November 1945 first as an advisory body and later on in 1987 given statutory status by an Act of Parliament, AICTE is responsible for proper planning and coordinated development of the technical education and management education system in India.

It is assisted by 10 Statutory Boards of Studies, namely, UG Studies in Eng. & Tech., PG and Research in Eng. and Tech., Management Studies, Vocational Education, Technical Education, Pharmaceutical Education, Architecture, Hotel Management and Catering Technology, Information Technology, Town and Country Planning. The AICTE has its new headquarters building in Delhi on the Nelson Mandela Road, Vasant Kunj, New Delhi, 110 067, which has the offices of the chairman, vice-chairman and the member secretary, plus it has regional offices at  Kanpur, Chandigarh, Gurgaon, Mumbai, Bhopal, Vadodara, Kolkata, Guwahati, Bangalore, Hyderabad, Chennai and Thiruvananthapuram.

In its 25 April 2013 judgment, the Supreme Court said "as per provisions of the AICTE Act and University Grants Commission (UGC) Act, the council has no authority which empowers it to issue or enforce any sanctions on colleges affiliated with the universities as its role is to provide only guidance and recommendations." Subsequently, AICTE was getting approval from the Supreme court to regulate technical colleges on a year to year basis till January 2016, when AICTE got blanket approval for publishing the Approval Process Handbook and approve technical colleges including management for the session 2016-17 and in all future sessions."

Objectives

According to the All India Council for Technical Education, 1987, the AICTE is vested with statutory authority for planning, formulation and maintenance of norms and standards, quality assurance through school accreditation, funding in priority areas, monitoring and evaluation, maintaining parity of certification and awards and ensuring coordinated and integrated development and management of technical education in the country. In the words of the Act itself:

AICTE bureaus
The AICTE is composed of the e-Governance, Approval, Planning and Coordination, Academic, University, Administration, Finance, and Research, Institutional and Faculty Development Bureaus. There are 10 additional Board Studies dealing with technician, vocational, undergraduate engineering, postgraduate engineering and research, architecture, town and country planning, pharmacy, management, applied arts and crafts, hotel management and catering technology education. For each bureau, adviser is the bureau head who is assisted by technical officers and other supporting staff. The multidiscipline technical officer and staff of the Council are on deputation or on contract from government departments, University Grants Commission, academic institutions, etc.

Increase in approved institutions
Growth of Technical Institutions in the Country

Growth of Seats in different Programs in Technical Institutions

Reforms 
In 2016, three important initiatives were taken up by AICTE. First one was a responsibility given by MHRD to evolve a national MOOCs platform SWAYAM. Second one is that of launching a Smart India Hackathon-2017 challenging the young bright talented students of technical colleges to solve the 598 problems of 29 different Government departments. Third one is that of launching of an AICTE's Student Start up Policy by Hon. President on 16 Nov, during visitors conference from rashtrapati Bhavan. In 2009, the Union Minister of Education formally communicated his intentions of closing down AICTE and related body, the University Grants Commission (UGC). This later led to reforms in the way the AICTE approves institutes, and to establishing the National Board of Accreditation (NBA) as an independent body.

On 6 June 2017, Prime Minister Narendra Modi announced that the AICTE along with the University Grants Commission would be scrapped and replaced by a new body called Heera (Higher Education Empowerment Regulation Agency (HEERA). This has been done in a bid to simplify the excessive regulations that exist due to both these bodies. According to the draft of law backed on the ideas of NITI Aayog and the Prime Minister Office, the National Council for Teacher Education was also planned to be subsumed by HEERA.

Memorandum of Understanding 

AICTE signs Memorandum of Understanding with Heartfulness Education Trust on making available the students,staff,counsellors and faculties of colleges,institues and universities accredited to former of the programmes and courses offered by HET.

See also
 Regional accreditation
 Education in India
 DOEACC
 Science and technology in India
 Indian Institute of Technology

References

External links
 

 
School accreditors
Educational institutions established in 1945
College accreditors in India
Ministry of Education (India)
Organisations based in Delhi
1945 establishments in India
Management education in India